The 2000–01 NBA season was the 31st season for the Portland Trail Blazers in the National Basketball Association. In the off-season, the Blazers acquired Dale Davis from the Indiana Pacers, and All-Star forward Shawn Kemp from the Cleveland Cavaliers in a three-team trade. The Blazers struggled losing three of their first four games, but soon recovered and later on posted a 10-game winning streak between January and February, and held a 35–15 record at the All-Star break. At midseason, the team re-signed free agent and former Blazers guard Rod Strickland, who was previously released by the Washington Wizards. Despite the strong start, the Blazers struggled and played below .500 for the remainder of the season, posting a 15–17 record after the All-Star break. Falling nine games below the previous season's mark, the Blazers nevertheless made the playoffs for the 19th consecutive year, finishing as the #7 seed in the Western Conference with a solid 50–32 record.

Rasheed Wallace averaged 19.2 points, 7.8 rebounds and 1.8 blocks per game, and was selected for the 2001 NBA All-Star Game, while Steve Smith provided the team with 13.6 points per game, and Bonzi Wells showed improvement averaging 12.7 points and 1.3 steals per game. In addition, Damon Stoudamire averaged 13.0 points, 5.7 assists and 1.3 steals per game, while Scottie Pippen provided with 11.3 points, 4.6 assists and 1.5 steals per game, Arvydas Sabonis contributed 10.1 points and 5.4 rebounds per game, and Davis averaged 7.2 points and 7.5 rebounds per game.

The Blazers faced the defending NBA champion Los Angeles Lakers in the Western Conference First Round, the same team they had pushed to the brink the year before in the Western Conference Finals. However, without Wells, who went down with a knee injury during the final month of the regular season, they were unable to do nearly as well this time, as the Lakers swept them in three straight games on the way to their second straight NBA championship, where they defeated the Philadelphia 76ers in five games.

Following the season, head coach Mike Dunleavy was fired after four seasons, and was replaced by former 76ers player Maurice Cheeks. Meanwhile, Smith was traded to the San Antonio Spurs, while Strickland signed as a free agent with the Miami Heat, Greg Anthony was traded to the Chicago Bulls, Stacey Augmon signed with the Charlotte Hornets, and Sabonis and Detlef Schrempf both retired. However, Sabonis would return for the 2002–03 season.

Draft picks

Roster

Regular season

Season standings

z - clinched division title
y - clinched division title
x - clinched playoff spot

Record vs. opponents

Game log

Playoffs

| home_wins = 0
| home_losses = 1
| road_wins = 0
| road_losses = 2
}}
|- align="center" bgcolor="#ffcccc"
| 1
| April 22
| @ L.A. Lakers
| L 93–106
| Rasheed Wallace (24)
| Arvydas Sabonis (9)
| three players tied (4)
| Staples Center18,997
| 0–1
|- align="center" bgcolor="#ffcccc"
| 2
| April 26
| @ L.A. Lakers
| L 88–106
| Scottie Pippen (21)
| Scottie Pippen (8)
| Damon Stoudamire (5)
| Staples Center18,997
| 0–2
|- align="center" bgcolor="#ffcccc"
| 3
| April 29
| L.A. Lakers
| L 86–99
| Smith, Stoudamire (25)
| Rasheed Wallace (13)
| Stoudamire, Wallace (4)
| Rose Garden20,580
| 0–3
|-

Player statistics

NOTE: Please write the players statistics in alphabetical order by last name.

Season

Playoffs

Awards and honors
 Rasheed Wallace, NBA All-Star

Transactions

 July 21, 2000: Signed free agent Rodrick Rhodes
 August 13, 2000: Re-signed Greg Anthony
 August 30, 2000: Traded forward Brian Grant to the Miami Heat and guard Gary Grant to the Cleveland Cavaliers in exchange for Shawn Kemp (from the Cavaliers).
 August 31, 2000: Traded forward Jermaine O'Neal and center Joe Kleine to the Indiana Pacers in exchange for Dale Davis
 September 13, 2000: Signed free agent center Will Perdue
 September 12, 2000: Re-signed guard-forward Stacey Augmon
 September 15, 2000: Signed draft pick Erick Barkley
 October 3, 2000: Forward Detlef Schrempf retired
 October 4, 2000: Signed free agent C.J. Bruton
 October 4, 2000: Signed free agent Todd Lindeman
 October 4, 2000: Signed free agent Ime Udoka
 October 26, 2000: Waived Jamel Thomas
 October 26, 2000: Waived C.J. Bruton
 October 26, 2000: Waived Todd Lindeman
 October 28, 2000: Waived Ime Udoka
 October 30, 2000: Waived Rodrick Rhodes
 November 30, 2000: Forward Bonzi Wells was suspended one game by the NBA for striking an official.
 February 2, 2001: Forward Rasheed Wallace was suspended two games by the NBA
 March 5, 2001: Waived guard Gary Grant
 March 5, 2001: Signed guard Rod Strickland
 April 3, 2001: Guard Rod Strickland was suspended one game by the NBA due to a DUI charge
 April 3, 2001: Forward Rasheed Wallace was suspended one game by the Trail Blazers
 April 29, 2001: Forward-center Dale Davis was suspended one game by the NBA for elbowing the Los Angeles Lakers' forward Robert Horry.
 April 29, 2001: Guard-forward Stacey Augmon was suspended one game by the NBA for leaving the bench during an altercation on the court.

Player Transactions Citation:

References

Portland Trail Blazers seasons
Portland Trail Blazers 2000
Port
Port
Port
Portland Trail Blazers